Hédouville is a commune in the Val-d'Oise department in Île-de-France in northern France.

Geography
Hédouville is located just inside Île-de-France, on its border with Hauts-de-France. The town is part of the Parc Naturel Régional du Véxin Français.

Toponymy
The town name has German origins from Haidulf (name) and Latin villa (domain). Hédouville is therefore interpreted as "Domain of Haidulf".

See also
Communes of the Val-d'Oise department

References

External links

Association of Mayors of the Val d'Oise 

Communes of Val-d'Oise